The Phalanx are a fictional cybernetic species appearing in American comic books published by Marvel Comics. They have come in conflict with the X-Men as well as other groups on several occasions. They form a hive mind, linking each member by a telepathic system.

Publication history
The Phalanx were co-created by writer Scott Lobdell and artist Joe Madureira but owe much in concept and appearance to the original Technarchy (by writer Chris Claremont and artist Bill Sienkiewicz). Although appearing in prototype variations in earlier issues, the Phalanx first appeared in their full form in Uncanny X-Men #312 (May 1994).

Fictional biography

Origins
While their true origins are still unclear, Phalanx were thought to be formed when organic lifeforms are infected with the Technarchy's techno-organic transmode virus, but, in fact, they are actually an artificial intelligence that operates on a galactic scale, and they have total control of a host galaxy. The Phalanx were apparently created by the Titans, singularities of consciousness so vast and dense, that they have caved in on their own combined intelligence to form black holes - realms that exist outside normal spacetime and where the Phalanx dwell. The Titans are also singular intellects and not a collective or a group. A single black hole is a Titan intelligence, up to five black holes confined to a galactic cluster or a dense collection of stacked galaxies becomes a Stronghold, warring factions seeking to actively destroy or absorb other Strongholds in order to achieve a Dominion status which is when 10 or more of these incomprehensible cosmologically-scaled beings act in unison to control a particular sector or sectors of space in both the area and epochs of time, becoming galaxy-spanning, interconnected tears in the fabric of existence. The only primal threats to them are Galactus and the Phoenix.

The Phalanx have existed for 100,000 life cycles and have the collective knowledge of previous generations. They are infected with a Techno-Organic Virus and created the Technarchy to act as their cosmic janitors. The Phalanx may even be a higher evolution of the Technarchy or be multiple Technarchies that are unaware of each other's existence. What is known is that their ultimate goal is to expand its own intelligence by consuming the whole universe. They are extremely advanced and based on the Kardashev scale, they are considered a Type III civilization, and although the Kree's Black Judges were able to capture some of them, to study their hive-mind to see if they could weaponize them and use them against rival empires, they were forced to deemed them a failure due to their advanced adaptivity. Their fleet consists of a variety of types of ships including cruisers and warships, which they use to invade the space regions of spacefaring civilizations. When they reach a populated planet, they inspect its society first. If the society is judged unworthy, the Phalanx invade by way of seeding the planet with the Techno-Organic Virus which compels the victims to infect each other until reaching critical mass. At that time, by hard-wired instruction, the victims build a "Babel Spire" to contact and attract the Technarchy. Once a Technarch arrives, they invariably destroy the Phalanx "nest", usually by converting the entire planet into techno-organic matter and draining its energy. However, if the society is found worthy, an Ascension occurs by way of assimilation, the society's tangible forms and world will be destroyed as fodder for the Phalanx, but the population's minds, memories and intelligence will be assimilated and live forever on within the Phalanx's hive-mind.

Phalanx on Earth

The Phalanx on Earth were initially formed by a group of human mutant haters who voluntarily infected themselves with the Transmode virus, taken from the ashes of Warlock, a renegade Technarch who had joined the New Mutants, in an attempt to turn them into "living Sentinels". Steven Lang, the man who had used the Sentinels against the X-Men many years before, was recruited from a mental hospital to become an "interface". Uninfected by the Transmode virus, Lang was meant to be a buffer, keeping the Phalanx "on track" for its intended purpose. Lang was assisted by Cameron Hodge, a fellow anti-mutant with immortality obtained from the demon N'astirh. Years ago, in a failed effort to contract the Transmode virus, Hodge had killed Warlock. In an attempt to destroy Archangel, Hodge used a Phalanx construct of Candy Southern.

Phalanx' initial attempt to assimilate mutants into its collective was thwarted by the natural resistance of mutants to the Transmode virus. In a scheme to subvert the X-Men's mutant genome knowledge base, Phalanx attacked the X-Mansion, kidnapped most of the X-Men and replaced them with disguised Phalanx members. Banshee returned to the school after the attack and kidnappings. The imposters' ignorance of Professor X's inability to walk alerted Banshee to their deception. Sabretooth, recruited from a cell in the complex, joined with Banshee to save Emma Frost and Jubilee. When Banshee discovered the Phalanx had accessed the location of several young mutants for use in further study, he alerted Wolverine and Cable. In turn, they recruited Cyclops and Jean Grey. Professor X, Excalibur, X-Factor and X-Force sought the location of a third, unknown, group of Phalanx. To prevent the Phalanx from accessing any further information, Banshee destroyed the knowledge base.

While Banshee's group scrambled to save the young mutants, they were followed closely by the Phalanx impersonating several beings, notably police officers. The group was joined by the mutant Synch that could copy powers which proved helpful as Banshee's screams easily subdued many Phalanx entities. The rest of the targeted mutants were being held by Harvest in an old, decommissioned battleship and disguised itself as Gregor, an imprisoned farm boy-type mutant. The disguise was suspected by some of the prisoners. Eventually, the group saved all the targeted new mutants except for Blink having sacrificed herself to save the rest and killing Harvest.

The rest of these young mutants went on to become the core of Generation X, tutored by Banshee and Emma Frost. Meanwhile, the other mutant teams found a group of Phalanx attempting to follow their genetic instruction to construct a Babel Spire to contact the Technarchy. Douglock led a small team consisting of Forge, Wolfsbane and Cannonball in destroying the spire. Cyclops' group assaulted the core Phalanx base on Mount Everest, where the X-Men were held. They were covertly assisted by Lang having realised the Phalanx had grown beyond his ability to manipulate and were threatening the general human population. The smaller Phalanx nests around the world were destroyed as a result of this confrontation.

Much later it was revealed that before the Phalanx Covenant happened, Mister Sinister managed to capture one member of this techno-organic race and experimented upon it in order to clone himself into the single-minded collective. As Sinister experimented on it, the Phalanx member lost the mental link to its brethren. When Sinister eventually succeeded, he destroyed the lab and everything inside, including most of this being. A scrap of it remained and combined with earthworms, which didn't have minds, so they simply added to its physical makeup, growing and growing slowly. Upon surfacing, it attempted to link up with the Phalanx, but was too weak. Left alone, it eventually discovered that when it attempted to assimilate humans to form a new collective mind, their minds are wiped out and the humans essentially die, adding just their physical mass. Desperate to locate the rest of the Phalanx, to once more feel the sense of unity and togetherness they shared, it absorbed more and more people, hopping to gain the strength needed to signal them. However its energy signature is detected by Agent Abigail Brand of S.W.O.R.D. alerting the X-Men, horrified to find this Phalanx member had absorbed an entire town. As the X-Men face it they can't prevent this Phalanx from turning into a Babel Spire so it could contact the Technarchy, yet, things do not go as it hoped, and the X-Men eventually destroyed the techno-organic virus as Storm wonders, "It said we didn't understand. Could we have understood one another? Is there anything we shared?" Cyclops' response, "I doubt we'll ever know."

Clones of the Phalanx (and others) remain captive in Mister Sinister's prize collection. However, despite Sinister's best efforts, they were wiped from existence by the Phoenix Force.

The Shi'ar Massacre
Another group of Phalanx later almost decimated the Shi'ar Empire in the absence of the Imperial Guard. With their bodies now pitch-black, except for a few red and blue glowing sensor slits, this new breed only displayed the basic Phalanx and Technarchy features while shapeshifting or when individuals were damaged. These Phalanx also considered themselves as "pure" Phalanx compared to such sects like the one on Earth and hadn't any reservations about infecting mutants with the transmode virus as they almost transformed Rogue. The Phalanx made their way to Chandilar, the throneworld of the Shi'ar Empire where they tried to assimilate the "Nest", actually the hatching chamber where all Shi'ar eggs were being nurtured. Had they succeeded, the entire next generation of Shi'ar would have become part of the Phalanx collective. However, Beast developed a device that would emit a certain frequency to separate the organic from the technological part, causing all Phalanx within its range to dissolve but not before thousands or more Shi'ar were massacred. The rest of this group later conquered another planet, but were destroyed by the Magus after the construction of a Babel Spire.

Annihilation: Conquest

A new breed of Phalanx is seen in Annihilation: Conquest, the sequel to the Annihilation crossover, as the primary villain with the Super-Adaptoid as an enforcer. They tried to begin where Annihilus left off. When the Kree began the test of the new defensive network, the Phalanx managed to corrupt the system directly through the Kree homeworld of Hala, surrounding the entire Kree Empire in an inescapable energy barrier. They also spread their Transmode Virus, turning all organic life forms into Phalanx, fully under their control and members of their single-minded matrix. High-powered beings such as Ronan the Accuser were made into their group Select, used to cut off any attempts to stop the spread and control of the Phalanx. The Kree who didn't fall under control fought back against their oppressors as well as Quasar (Phyla Vell), Moondragon, Adam Warlock, Star-Lord and the Dirty Half Dozen only to discover that they were under Ultron's guidance.

It was later revealed that the Kree had in the past, captured several hive-mind species, to weaponize them and use them against rival empires, among them the Phalanx. They were however deemed a failure by the Black Judges due to their advanced adaptivity.

Moira's 6th Life
1,000 years set in the future, the Phalanx are apparently summoned to Earth by a signal sent by the Librarian, one member of the artificially created race known as Post-Humans or "Homo novissima", the genetically engineered next step of human evolution that will rule the Earth and bring mutants nearly to extinction, who appears to be searching for a chance to use their library of mutant consciousness to ascend into the Phalanx's intelligence to create something more. Machine and mutant sentience could come together instead of the endless cycle of war that has come to define tale after tale of mutants vs. sentinels. While the Phalanx ultimately agree to the Librarian's offering, therefore initiating the "Ascencion", the process that leads to the assimilation of their entire race and world into the Phalanx, so that they can fuel the work the Phalanx does in service for the Titans. However the true goal of the Librarian is for the Post-Humans to reach Godhood, as while no longer having a physical body after the Phalanx assimilate them, their psyche will still exist beyond space and time.

Experimentation
Given the powerful nature of the Phalanx, different individuals and governments attempted to experiment with the alien race.

 British intelligence group Black Air acquired several Phalanx specimens, and determined how to control them. They used at least one Phalanx (which had a Brood as its template) as a guardian "warliquid" at their London headquarters, the Blackwall. They kidnapped and manipulated Douglock as part of a plot to gain outright dominion over the earth by the channeling of demonic energy.
 After a battle with the Silver Surfer, Cable was partially lobotomized in order to save his life from the angry herald of Galactus. Now trying to save him, Deadpool tracked down the Fixer to save Cable. Deadpool was in possession of a Phalanx fetus, having taken it from an AIM facility, which Fixer surgically grafted onto his body. After a brief scuffle for control, Cable's mind overwhelmed that of the fetal alien and made it subservient to him so that it would not try to "assimilate" him into the collective.
 Before the Phalanx Covenant event started, it was revealed that Mister Sinister was able to capture a Phalanx which he kept experimenting until he was capable to replicate their hive mind form which he then used to link himself with every clone of him by a telepathic system.

Attributes
Unlike the savagely individualistic Technarchy, Phalanx form an insectoid hive mind. While each member retains memories from prior to assimilation and a degree of their personality, generally each member cannot perform actions against the wishes of the group mind without first being severed from the collective consciousness, as Douglock was.

Phalanx, like the Technarchy, can infect other organisms with the transmode virus with any physical contact - the only known exception being Earth mutants who possess a degree of immunity to the transmode virus. This seems to be a limitation of the Phalanx which their Technarchy progenitors do not have, as Warlock had no problems infecting his future teammate Magik (accidentally) when they first met and repeatedly infecting Cypher to form the Douglock entity on multiple occasions; In Cypher's case the effect was reversed without apparent incident, though Warlock was constantly worried that a time would come when the reversal would not take.

Any organism infected by the Phalanx is automatically inducted into the group mind. Recently, however, Ultron's guidance have allowed certain individuals with exceptional powers and/or abilities to become the "Selects", beings who are connected to the Phalanx hive mind, but retain their individual identities.

Phalanx also possess the Technarchs' abilities to shapeshift and teleport, but (unlike the Technarchs) cannot grow in size and mass without absorbing external matter. Over time, they can adapt to attack from inherent biological powers, but only to the specific frequencies/levels/etc. already used against them.

Other versions

Marvel 2099
In the possible future known as 2099, the Phalanx tried to invade the planet Earth a second time. To prevent Earth from being converted by the Transmode Virus, Spider-Man (Miguel O'Hara) forms an uneasy alliance with Dr. Doom, who had encountered the Phalanx in their first attempt to invade Earth in the 20th century. Doom knew that the Phalanx would have a "scout program" so he added his own subroutine to the coding called subroutine Cynthia which would erase the scout program. When Doom jumped to the future he lost track of the scout program and therefore created the Mutant Messiah myth to track the carrier down again.

When, during a mission, the mutant Nostromo becomes sheathed in a strange cocoon, he reveals himself to be the carrier when he "hatches" as a Phalanx. Doom sends some operatives to bring the boy to him, however, some of the operatives turn out to be Phalanx themselves and begin attacking the group.

Nostromo is eventually delivered to Doom, who then activates the subroutine within Nostromo and, bidding Spider-Man to take him to safety, blows up his castle, while Twilight brings reinforcements of aboriginal Martians to destroy the Phalanx in orbit.

Exiles
In the Exiles series, the dimension-hopping team visited a world infested by a mutated version of the Phalanx. On this world, Cypher fell ill with the Legacy Virus and in an act of desperation Warlock infected him with the transmode virus to try and save his life. Unfortunately the two diseases combined and mutated into something far worse. Within the year, almost all of the world's population were transformed into Phalanx drones, calling themselves the Vi-Locks. The group was led by Forge whose innate understanding of machinery made him a prime candidate for leadership. In the course of the team's mission, Blink was infected and slowly started succumbing to the virus. On a hunch, Morph was able to contact the Asgardians whose divine blood was able to heal the victims after they received a transfusion.

Cable
In yet another alternate reality, the Phalanx has overrun Earth, assimilating every lifeform. The mutant Cable serves as its central consciousness.

In other media

Television
 The Phalanx appeared in the X-Men: The Animated Series two-part episode "Phalanx Covenant", with the voracious Phalanx Nexus voiced by Lally Cadeau and additional forms voiced by Stephen Ouimette and Don Francks. An amalgamation of the original comics version and the Technarchy, this version of the species can assume the guise of anything or anyone and can assimilate humans.
 The Phalanx appears in the Ultimate Spider-Man episode "Home Sick Hulk", voiced by Fred Tatasciore. Taking inspiration from the Annihilation Conquest design, this version is a metallic dwarfish insectoid that can infect organic lifeforms and absorb organic matter.
 A variation of the Phalanx appears in Avengers Assemble, voiced by Jim Meskimen. This version resembles the Annihilation Conquest incarnation and serves as Ultron's nano-virus.

Video games
The Phalanx appear in X-Men 2: Clone Wars.

References

Primary sources
 Phalanx Covenant
 Uncanny X-Men #291, #305-306, #343-344
 Warlock (M-Tech) #7
 Annihilation Conquest Prologue

External links
 

Characters created by Bill Sienkiewicz
Characters created by Chris Claremont
Characters created by Joe Madureira
Characters created by Scott Lobdell
Comics characters introduced in 1994
Marvel Comics alien species
Marvel Comics characters who are shapeshifters
Marvel Comics characters with superhuman strength
Marvel Comics robots
Marvel Comics supervillains
Fictional artificial intelligences
Fictional parasites and parasitoids
Hive minds in fiction
X-Men supporting characters